Israil Magomedgireyevich Arsamakov ((born February 8, 1962 in Grozny, Chechen–Ingush ASSR) is a former Soviet weightlifter of Ingush descent and Olympic champion who competed for the Soviet Union.

Arsamakov won a gold medal at the 1988 Summer Olympics in Seoul.

References

External links 
 Israil Arsamakov at Lift Up

1962 births
Living people
Ingush people
Russian male weightlifters
Soviet male weightlifters
Olympic weightlifters of the Soviet Union
Weightlifters at the 1988 Summer Olympics
Olympic gold medalists for the Soviet Union
Sportspeople from Grozny
Olympic medalists in weightlifting
Medalists at the 1988 Summer Olympics
Honoured Masters of Sport of the USSR